Guitarro could refer to:

 Guitarro (instrument), a type of baroque guitar in Spain
 Guitarro, a type of ray in the guitarfish family
 USS Guitarro, the name of multiple ships in the United States Navy

See also
 Guitaro